Drews Gap (el. 5306 ft.) is a mountain pass in the U.S. state of Oregon traversed by Oregon Route 140. It is named for Major Charles S. Drew of the 1st Oregon Cavalry, who surveyed a route from Fort Klamath east to the Owyhee River in 1864 that became the Oregon Central Military Road.

It is located between Drews Reservoir  and Booth State Scenic Corridor which is just east of the summit and 12 miles west of Lakeview.

References

Mountain passes of Oregon
Landforms of Lake County, Oregon